Katarina Konow born in Gnosjö in Jönköping County is a Swedish model and beauty queen who placed 1-runner up in Miss Universe Sweden in 2012, and represented Sweden in Miss International 2012 in Japan. Konow now holds the title Miss International Sweden 2012.

References

External links
Official site

Swedish beauty pageant winners
Swedish female models
Living people
Miss International 2012 delegates
Year of birth missing (living people)